Hubert Ebenezer Sizer (7 August 1893 – 4 May 1973) was an Australian politician. He was a member of the Legislative Assembly of Queensland from 1918 to 1935, representing Nundah until 1923 and Sandgate thereafter. He was a member of the National, the United Party of Queensland, and then the Country and Progressive National parties.

References

1893 births
1973 deaths
National Party (Queensland, 1917) members of the Parliament of Queensland
Members of the Queensland Legislative Assembly
Place of birth missing
20th-century Australian politicians
British emigrants to Australia